In Arab folklore, the Nasnas ( an-nasnās) is a monstrous creature. According to Edward Lane, the 19th century translator of The Thousand and One Nights, a nasnas is "half a human being; having half a head, half a body, one arm, one leg, with which it hops with much agility".

In Somali folklore there is a similar creature called "xunguruuf" or "Hungruf". It's believed it can kill a person by just touching them and the person would be fleshless in mere seconds.

It was believed to be the offspring of a jinn called a Shiqq and a human being. A character in "The Story of the Sage and the Scholar", a tale from the collection, is turned into a nasnas after a magician applies kohl to one of his eyes. The nasnas is mentioned in Gustave Flaubert's The Temptation of Saint Anthony.

See also
Fachan
Monopod (creature)

Sources
 Robert Irwin The Arabian Nights: a Companion (Penguin, 1994)
 Jorge Luis Borges The Book of Imaginary Beasts (Penguin, 1974)

References

Arabian legendary creatures
Jinn